Mary Lou Baker (born 1914–1965) was a member of the Florida House of Representatives and a women's rights activist.

Early life 
Born in Utah, Baker moved to Florida in 1925, where her father served as a judge and her mother headed the Florida Democratic Women's Club.

Education 
She had a law degree from Stetson University.

Career 
Baker held a seat in the Florida House of Representatives from 1942 to 1945. In this role, she passed the Women's Rights bill to let women operate their family business while their husband was serving in the military, including the conveying property, create documents, and sue. She was also a strong advocate of co-ed education and was instrumental for the inclusion of women in the University of Florida. She also tried unsuccessfully to open juries to women, something that would not be accomplished until 1949.  In 1946, she lost her bid for reelection and returned to practicing as a lawyer.

Death 
Baker died in 1965 at age 50. She was survived by a son. After many years of nominations, she was inducted to the Florida Women's Hall of Fame in 2017.

References 

1914 births
1965 deaths
Members of the Florida House of Representatives
20th-century American lawyers
Women state legislators in Florida
20th-century American politicians
20th-century American women politicians
Florida Women's Hall of Fame Inductees